Opp is a local online and print newspaper published in Oppdal, Norway. Published in tabloid format, the newspaper had a circulation of 2,308 in 2013. The newspaper is independently owned. It has one weekly issues, on Thursdays. The newspaper was founded in 2002 and competes with Opdalingen.

References

Newspapers published in Norway
Oppdal
Mass media in Trøndelag
Norwegian-language newspapers
Publications established in 2002
2002 establishments in Norway